The Alpercatas River is a river of Maranhão state in northeastern Brazil. It is a tributary of the Itapecuru River.

Some of the headwaters of the river are protected by the  Mirador State Park, created in 1980.

See also
List of rivers of Maranhão

References

Rivers of Maranhão